Sanjay Sharma may refer to:
 Sanjay Sharma (ophthalmologist)
 Sanjay Sharma (serial killer)